Max Lynn Stackhouse (July 29, 1935 – January 30, 2016) was the Rimmer and Ruth de Vries Professor of Reformed Theology and Public Life Emeritus at Princeton Theological Seminary. He was ordained in the United Church of Christ  and was the president of the Berkshire Institute for Theology and the Arts.

He specialized in theological ethics and social life, Christianity and the ethics of the world religions, and public theology, and the mission of the churches. He taught courses on the place of faith in educational life, the theological implications of the arts, religion and journalism, and theology in relation to the environment. He was the first director of Princeton Theological Seminary's Abraham Kuyper Center for Public Theology.

Academic life
Dr. Stackhouse retired from his position as the Stephen Colwell Professor of Christian Ethics (1993-2004), Director of the Project on Public Theology and the Rimmer and Ruth de Vries Professor of Reformed Theology and Public Life at Princeton Theological Seminary.

His doctoral dissertation at Harvard University (1961 - 1965) was entitled "Eschatology and Ethical Method in W. Rauschenbusch and H. Niebuhr." He has an M.A. and B.D. from Harvard Divinity School (1958 - 1961), and a B.A from DePauw University (1957).

Max L. Stackhouse was the Coordinating Editor of the Center of Theological Inquiry's groundbreaking God and Globalization project. The findings of the project are edited Stackhouse in partnership with Peter J. Paris, Don S. Browning, and Diane Obenchain and published in 4 volumes entitled God and Globalization by Trinity International Press and Continuum International Publishing Group. The three former volumes are multi-authored while the fourth volume is authored solely by Stackhouse, with a foreword written by the  historian Justo Gonzalez. In the final interpretive volume, Stackhouse argues for a view of Christian theology that, in critical dialogue with other world religions and philosophies, is able to engage the new world situation, play a critical role in reforming the "powers" that are becoming more diverse and autonomous, and generate a social ethic for the 21st century.

He also served as the "Herbert Gezork Professor of Christian Social Ethics" at Andover Newton Theological School for almost 30 years, as well as the Robert and Carolyn Frederick Distinguished Visiting Professor of Ethics at DePauw University during the spring semester of 2006-07. Also, He was a visiting professor at United Theological College, Bangalore. In 2010, a collection of essays was published to honor Stackhouse and his works in public theology entitled Public Theology for a Global Society: Essays in Honor of Max L. Stackhouse, edited by Deidre King Hainsworth and Scott R. Paeth (Wm. B. Eerdmans Publishing, 2010).

Professional Memberships and Offices:
President, 1986-87 Society of Christian Ethics
President, 1982-92 James Luther Adams Foundation
Editorial Board, The Christian Century
Editorial Board, Journal of Political Theology
Editorial Board, Religion in Eastern Europe
Member, American Theological Society
Member, American Academy of Religion
Member, American Society for Political and Legal Philosophy
Member, Société Européenne de Culture
Member, Amnesty International USA

Past Church Activities:
China Academic Consortium (Christian Scholars Exchange and Research Program) B Board Member
World Reformed Alliance - Roman Catholic Bilateral Consultations
World Council of Churches Conference on Faith, Science and the Future
Moscow Interfaith Peace Conference-National Council of Churches & Russian Orthodox Church
Evangelische Kirche der Union-UCC Working Group, Board for World Ministries
World Reformed Alliance-Mennonite Bilateral Consultations
Delegate, American Committee for Human Rights, Mission Team to the Philippines
Delegate, Consultation on the German Churches and Unification, Munich

Personal life 
He and his wife, Jean Stackhouse have two sons: Dale and David. He died on 30 January 2016 at his home in West Stockbridge, Massachusetts. His memorial service was held on 13 February at The First Congregational Church of Stockbridge, MA.

Selected publications

Articles
 "A Premature Postmodern." First Things 106 (October 2000): 19-22.
 "Spheres of Management." Theology Today 60, 3 (October 2003): 370-383.
 "Civil Religion, Political Theology and Public Theology: What's the Difference?" Political Theology 5, 3 (July 2004): 275-293.
 "For Fairer Trade: Justice and the Global Market." Christian Century 124, 16 (August 7, 2007): 28-31.
 "The Christian Ethic of Love." Journal of Religious Ethics 35, 4 (December, 2007): 700-711.
 "Framing the Global Ethos." Theology Today 66, 4 (January 2010): 415-429.
 "Global Engagement: How My Mind Has Changed." Christian Century 128, 8 (April 19, 2011): 30-34.

Chapters
 "Christianity and the Prospects for a New Global Order." In Christian Political Ethics, ed. John A. Coleman. Princeton: Princeton University Press, 2008.  
 "Christianity, Civil Society, and the State: A Protestant Response." In Christian Political Ethics, ed. John A. Coleman. Princeton: Princeton University Press, 2008.  
 "Ethics and Eschatology." In Oxford Handbook of Eschatology, ed. Jerry L. Walls. Oxford: Oxford University Press, 2008.

See also 

 Hainsworth, Deirdre King, and Scott R. Paeth (Ed). Public Theology for a Global Society: Essays in Honor of Max L. Stackhouse. Grand Rapids, MI: W.B. Eerdmans, 2010.

References

Further reading
 Max L. Stackhouse's lecture "Covenant Justice in a Global Era" at The Institute for Reformed Theology (accessed 18 October 2010)
 Max L. Stackhouse's lecture: "Globalization and the Forms of Grace:  Redeeming the Principalities, Authorities, and Dominions" (accessed 18 October 2010)
 Max L. Stackhouse's lecture at the 9th Annual Templeton Lecture on Religion and World Affairs entitled "Public Theology and Democracy’s Future" (accessed 18 October 2010)
 Max L. Stackhouse's article "Theology in the Public Square: Kuyper's Contributions Highlighted in New PTS Center" (accessed 18 October 2010)
 Max L. Stackhouse's article "Humanism after Tillich" (accessed 18 October 2010). Published in First Things 72 (April 1997): 24-28.
 Max L. Stackhouse's comments on Stanley Hauerwas' In Good Company: The Church as Polis (accessed 18 October 2010). Max L. Stackhouse, "In the Company of Hauerwas," Journal for Christian Theological Research 2:1 (1997) par. 1-30.
 Max L. Stackhouse's Presidential Address Framing the Global Ethos at The American Theological Society, dated 3 April, 2009 (accessed 18 October 2010)
 Max L. Stackhouse's CV dated January 2006 (accessed 18 October 2010)
 Max L. Stackhouse's faculty page at Princeton Theological Seminary (accessed 18 October 2010)

1935 births
2016 deaths
United Church of Christ members
Princeton Theological Seminary faculty
Andover Newton Theological School faculty
DePauw University alumni
Harvard Divinity School alumni
American theologians
Public theologians